1585 Union, provisional designation , is a dark background asteroid from the outer regions of the asteroid belt, approximately 52 kilometers in diameter. It was discovered on 7 September 1947, by South African astronomer Ernest Johnson at the Union Observatory in Johannesburg, South Africa. The asteroid was named after the discovering observatory.

Orbit and classification 

Union is not a member of any known asteroid family. It orbits the Sun in the outer main belt at a distance of 2.0–3.8 AU once every 5.01 years (1,830 days). Its orbit has an eccentricity of 0.31 and an inclination of 26° with respect to the ecliptic.

The body's observation arc begins at the Finnish Turku Observatory in February 1939, more than 17 years prior to its official discovery observation at Johannesburg.

Physical characteristics 

Union has been characterized as a P-type asteroid by the Wide-field Infrared Survey Explorer (WISE), while the LCDB assumes a generic carbonaceous C-type.

Rotation period 

In March 1984, a rotational lightcurve of Union was obtained from photometric observations by American astronomer Richard Binzel. Lightcurve analysis gave a rotation period of 9.38 hours with a brightness variation of 0.22 magnitude. In addition, a fragmentary lightcurve with a period of 24 hours was obtained by French amateur astronomer Laurent Bernasconi in 2004.

Diameter and albedo 

According to the surveys carried out by the Infrared Astronomical Satellite IRAS, the Japanese Akari satellite and the NEOWISE mission of NASA's WISE telescope, Union measures between 49.01 and 56.014 kilometers in diameter and its surface has an albedo between 0.0304 and 0.05.

The Collaborative Asteroid Lightcurve Link adopt the results obtained by IRAS, that is, an albedo of 0.0378 and a diameter of 50.42 kilometers. CALL also takes an absolute magnitude of 10.67 from Richard Binzel.

Naming 

This minor planet was named after the discovering Union Observatory, also known as the Johannesburg Observatory, Transvaal Observatory (1909–1912) and Republic Observatory (1961–1971). The official  was published by the Minor Planet Center in June 1953.

References

External links 
 Asteroid Lightcurve Database (LCDB), query form (info )
 Dictionary of Minor Planet Names, Google books
 Asteroids and comets rotation curves, CdR – Observatoire de Genève, Raoul Behrend
 Discovery Circumstances: Numbered Minor Planets (1)-(5000) – Minor Planet Center
 
 

001585
Discoveries by Ernest Leonard Johnson
Named minor planets
19470907